Joseph C. "Joe" Pickett (born December 6, 1956) is an American politician who served as a Democratic member of the Texas House of Representatives from 1995 until his resignation in January 2019. Pickett represented the 79th District, which encompasses part of El Paso County.

Political career
Pickett started his political career as a City Council member for the City of El Paso, Texas, defeating the incumbent in 1991. He served on the City Council until he was elected to the position of State Representative for the 79th District in 1994.

He served with three House Speakers (Pete Laney, Tom Craddick and Joe Straus and three governors: (George W. Bush, Rick Perry and Greg Abbott).

In June 2015, Pickett was named by Texas Monthly magazine as one of the "Worst Legislators of 2015," referencing an incident during a House Transportation Committee meeting where Pickett had another member of the legislature removed. There was a suspicion of the improper registration of witnesses on a certain bill to create a misconception of overwhelming support for the bill up for consideration. In September 2015, the House Committee on General Investigation & Ethics and the Texas Rangers released a finding of no fault on Pickett's behalf and a call for change to the House current Witness Registration was made by the Ethics Committee.

He served on the House Research Organization (HRO) steering committee. In addition, he was a member of the House Committee on Investments and Financial Services, as well as the House Committee on Redistricting. He has also served on the Licensing and Administrative Procedures Committee, Land and Natural Resources, Juvenile Justice & Family Affairs.

Pickett resigned from the Texas House in January 2019 in order to fight cancer. A special election was called to determine his successor.

Personal life

Pickett holds a Texas Real Estate Broker's license and has been a real estate educator for more than two decades. He has written and published textbooks on real estate laws for continuing education classes. He is the author of several children's books, including Margo! The Weird Cat! (2006) and Two Apples and Two Cookies.

Bibliography
 Pickett, Joe C. (2006).  Margo! the Weird Cat!.  Salt Lake City, Utah: Utah Aardvark Global Publishing Co.  .

See also

 List of children's literature authors
 List of people from Texas

References

External links
 Official biography on the Texas House of Representatives website
 

1956 births
20th-century American politicians
21st-century American novelists
21st-century American politicians
American children's writers
Living people
Democratic Party members of the Texas House of Representatives
Politicians from El Paso, Texas
American male novelists
20th-century American male writers
21st-century American male writers